Rosângela Teress Semedo Lagos (born May 9, 1980) is a Cape Verdean female basketball player.

External links
Profile at fiba.com

1980 births
Living people
Sportspeople from Praia
Cape Verdean women's basketball players